The Oxford Centre for Islamic Studies (OCIS) was founded in 1985. It is a centre for the advanced study of Islam and Muslim societies located in Oxford, England, and a registered educational charity. Its Patron is The Prince of Wales. In 2012 it was granted a Royal Charter by Queen Elizabeth II. The governance of the Centre is managed by a Board of Trustees made up of scholars and statesmen from around the world, and representatives of the University of Oxford nominated by the Council.  

The Centre is dedicated to the study, from a multi-disciplinary perspective, of all aspects of Islamic culture and civilization and of contemporary Muslim societies.  The Centre's Fellows are active in different departments, faculties and colleges across the University. Many students and senior academics come to Oxford, over the years, through the Centre's Scholarships and Visiting Fellowships programmes. The Centre arranges lectures, seminars, workshops and conferences, exhibitions and other academic events throughout the academic year.

Many distinguished statesmen and scholars have lectured at the Centre in a programme that began in 1993 with the Prince of Wales' inaugural lecture, 'Islam and the West'. Lecturers in this series have included heads of state and government, internationally renowned scholars from the Muslim world and beyond, secretary generals of international organisations, including the UN, OIC, Arab League, UNESCO, and the Commonwealth).

The Centre started life in a wooden hut on St Cross Road. It then moved to office accommodation in George Street in 1990. It moved into a new building, designed by the Egyptian architect Abdel-Wahed El-Wakil, during the academic year of 2016/2017.

References

External links
 OCIS website

Centre For Islamic Studies
Islamic Studies, Centre
Centre For Islamic Studies
Educational institutions established in 1985
Islamic organisations based in the United Kingdom
Islam and politics
Centre For Islamic Studies
Centre For Islamic Studies
Centre For Islamic Studies
Islamic education in the United Kingdom
New Classical architecture
1985 establishments in England
Abdel-Wahed El-Wakil buildings